This article provides links to the Malaysian federal election results for the parliamentary constituency of Putrajaya since 2004.

Federal level

Federal election results
 Results of the 2013 Malaysian general election by parliamentary constituency#Federal Territory of Putrajaya
 Results of the 2008 Malaysian general election by parliamentary constituency#Federal Territory of Putrajaya
 Results of the 2004 Malaysian general election by parliamentary constituency#Federal Territory of Putrajaya

Federal constituencies
 List of Malaysian electoral districts#Federal Territory of Putrajaya
 List of former Malaysian federal electoral districts#Federal Territories

Elected members of the Dewan Rakyat
 Members of the Dewan Rakyat, 13th Malaysian Parliament#Federal Territory of Putrajaya
 Members of the Dewan Rakyat, 12th Malaysian Parliament#Federal Territory of Putrajaya
 Members of the Dewan Rakyat, 11th Malaysian Parliament#Federal Territory of Putrajaya

Elections in Malaysia